Open Ears (released September 20, 2010 by the label Inner Ear/Musikkkoperatørene - INEA 08) is a studio album by Vigleik Storaas Septet.

Reception 
The review by Tor Hammerø of the Norwegian electronic newspaper Nettavisen awarded the album four out of six.

Reviewer Erling Wicklund of the Norwegian radio broadcasting NRK states:

Track listing 
«Number One» (5:25)
«Fort Gaelic» (4:38)
«Haunting» (6:39)
«Cicada» (6:21)
«Reminiscing» (6:36)
«Every Now And Then» (8:02)
«Second Thought» (8:05)
«TTW» (5:49)
«Open Ears #1» (4:42)

Personnel 
Tore Johansen - trumpet and flugelhorn
Jukka Perko - alt and soprano saxophone
Tore Brunborg - tenor saxophone and flute
Øyvind Brække - trombone
Vigleik Storaas - piano
Mats Eilertsen - double bass
Per Oddvar Johansen - drums

Credits 
Mastered by Jan Erik Kongshaug
Mixed by Jan Erik Kongshaug
Recorded by Jan Erik Kongshaug

Notes 
Recorded and mixed 5 and 6 January 2010 at Rainbow Studio, Oslo

References 

Vigleik Storaas albums
2010 albums